Articles of agreement may refer to,

 Ship's articles
  Pirate code
 Articles of Agreement (cricket)